The Royal Air Force Sports Ground is a cricket ground in Uxbridge, situated behind RAF Uxbridge. The ground also goes by the name of Vine Lane, a nearby main road. It was first used in 1939 by the RAF. Teams such as the MCC, the Middlesex Cricket Board, the Army, Middlesex youth teams and the Combined Services have all played on the ground throughout its history.  The ground has seen one first-class match, in 1964, between the Combined Services and Cambridge University.

References

External links
Royal Air Force Sports Ground on CricketArchive
Royal Air Force Sports Ground on Cricinfo

Cricket grounds in London
Royal Air Force
Sport in the London Borough of Hillingdon
Sports venues completed in 1939